The agencies of the European Union (formally: Agencies, decentralised independent bodies, corporate bodies and joint undertakings of the European Union and the Euratom) are bodies of the European Union and the Euratom established as juridical persons through secondary EU legislation and tasked with a specific narrow field of work.

They are distinct from:
 international law juridical persons established through primary (treaty) legislation, either as an EU institution (the European Central Bank) or an EU body of other type (such as the European Investment Bank Group entities, the European University Institute, the European Stability Mechanism or the Unified Patent Court)
 other EU institutions
 other EU bodies lacking juridical personality, including the advisory bodies, the independent offices held by a single person (European Ombudsman, European Data Protection Supervisor), and the (non-independent, auxiliary) EU inter-institutional services, regardless whether established through treaty or secondary legislation
 the pan-EU organisational forms which are not considered constituent bodies of the EU or the Euratom, regardless whether possessing juridical personality (European Research Infrastructure Consortium, European political party, European political foundation, European grouping of territorial cooperation, Societas Europaea, Societas Cooperativa Europaea) or lacking it (European economic interest grouping)

Overview
In contrast to other EU bodies established through secondary legislation, each of more than fifty such entities has its own juridical personality granted by the EU law, recognised across the EU, and in some cases, also across the EEA countries, Switzerland, Serbia, Ukraine, the United Kingdom and Turkey. Nevertheless, in relations with other non-EU third countries, they are in general not recognised as independent entities, thus being considered either parts of the juridical personality of the EU or the Euratom.

Some of the agencies, decentralised independent bodies and joint undertakings of the European Union and the Euratom are tasked with answering the need to develop scientific or technical know-how in certain fields, others bring together different interest groups to facilitate dialogue at European and international level.

Existing agencies
They are divided into the following groups:

Decentralised agencies of the EU
Distinct from the EU institutions, the agencies of the European Union are specialist bodies set up to advise the Institutions and Member States in areas that affect everyone living in the Union. They are located in member states across the EU, providing services, information, and know-how. The total budget of all the decentralised agencies is approximately 0.8% of the EU's annual budget.

Single market agencies
Single market agencies (under the former I Pillar)

Common Security and Defence Policy agencies
Common Security and Defence Policy agencies (under the former II Pillar)

Area of freedom, security and justice agencies
Area of freedom, security and justice agencies (under the former III Pillar)

European supervisory authorities
European supervisory authorities (of the European System of Financial Supervision)

Banking union (Single Resolution Mechanism) bodies 
Single Resolution Mechanism bodies (of the European banking union)

Executive agencies of the EU
Executive agencies are created by European Commission for a fixed period.

Euratom agencies

Decentralised independent secondary-legislation bodies
Thé list includes the two decentralised bodies other than agencies, established as EU juridical persons through secondary legislation of the EU/Euratom.

Other secondary-law corporate bodies
The list includes the remaining two bodies other than agencies, decentralised bodies or joint undertakings, established as EU juridical persons through secondary legislation of the EU/Euratom.

Joint undertakings
A joint undertaking is a juridical person and a subsidiary body of the EU or the Euratom, established through an agreement between the European Commission, the participating  member states, and the European industry of a certain field, with the purpose of implementing a public-private partnership project.

of the European Union

of the Euratom

Non-existing decentralised bodies

Proposed and abandoned

Transformed or dissolved

Agencies

Euratom joint undertakings
Schnell-Brüter- Kernkraftwerksgesellschaft mbH' (SBK)
Hochtemperatur- Kernkraftwerk GmbH (HKG)

See also
 Directorate-General
 European integration – participation by non-EU states in EU initiatives
 Glossary of European Union concepts, acronyms, & jargon
 Meroni doctrine

References

Notes

External links

EU's main site about agencies
Decentralised agencies
 Attribution of the seat of EU agencies: European Council conclusions, December 2003
 EU agencies on social media
 Official social media accounts of EU agencies on Twitter and elsewhere
 Unofficial mirrors of social media accounts of EU agencies on Mastodon

 
European Union-related lists